Hapoel Lod may refer to:

 Hapoel Lod B.C., a basketball team representing Lod, Israel
 Hapoel Lod F.C., an Israeli football club based in Lod